Freddy Figueroa (born November 26, 1994) is an Ecuadorian judoka. He competed at the 2016 Summer Olympics in the men's +100 kg event, in which he was eliminated in the first round by Kim Sung-min.

References

External links
 

1994 births
Living people
Ecuadorian male judoka
Olympic judoka of Ecuador
Judoka at the 2016 Summer Olympics
Pan American Games medalists in judo
Pan American Games silver medalists for Ecuador
Judoka at the 2015 Pan American Games
Judoka at the 2019 Pan American Games
South American Games gold medalists for Ecuador
South American Games medalists in judo
Competitors at the 2018 South American Games
Medalists at the 2015 Pan American Games
Medalists at the 2019 Pan American Games
21st-century Ecuadorian people